Torbjörn Arvidsson (born May 6, 1968) is a former Swedish football player, who played as a defender for Halmstads BK. He is currently the assistant manager of Hajduk Split.

Career 

Starting his career in Kalmar FF he early moved to Halmstads BK in 1989, where he played until 2005.  During this time he became the player with most games in Allsvenskan for Halmstad so far, 306 games and 543 games in total, he won Allsvenskan twice and Svenska Cupen once and 1998-1999 he was the team captain and also playing several time in European cups.

He made his debut for the club in 1989 in the serie debut against Örebro SK and his last match became in the cup against Ystads IF FF in 2005.

Coaching career
From 2010 until he left Halmstad BK at the end of 2015, beside his role as the assistant manager of the first team, Arvidsson was also responsible for the clubs U-21 squad. Arvidsson continued his coaching career at Varbergs BoIS. He signed as an assistant manager on 4 January 2016. He left the club at the end of 2017 to join Kalmar FF, which already was announced in November 2017. Arvidsson was going to take charge of the U-17 squad.

On 7 January 2019, Arvidsson was promoted to the technical staff of the first team at Kalmar FF, functioning as one of the assistant managers.

Achievements 

 Halmstads BK:
 Allsvenskan:
 Champion: 1997, 2000
 Stora Silvret (2nd): 2004
 Lilla Silvret (3rd): 1995, 1999
 Bronze: 1998

 Svenska Cupen:
 Champion: 1995

References

External links 
 Svenskafans.com article 

1968 births
Living people
Swedish footballers
Association football defenders
Allsvenskan players
Kalmar FF players
Halmstads BK players
Halmstads BK non-playing staff